Yuxarı Qaradağlı (also, Karadagly) is a village in the Tartar Rayon of Azerbaijan.

References 
Citations

Sources

Populated places in Tartar District